Colonel Sir David Harris  (12 July 1852 - 23 September 1942) was a soldier, diamond magnate, and legislator.

Early life 
He was born in London, England, and emigrated to the Colony of Natal in 1871. He later traveled 950 km from Durban to Kimberley where he began working as a prospector. Within two years, he was wealthy and had made the acquaintance of Cecil Rhodes.

Career

Military service 
He joined the Du Toit's Pan Horse Regiment in 1876 fought in the Gaika-Galeka war (part of the Xhosa Wars in the Eastern Cape. He also fought in other campaigns and distinguished himself in the Langeberg Rebellion (1896-97).

He served in the Home Guard during the Siege of Kimberley.

Member of Parliament 
In 1897, he joined the Parliament of the Cape of Good Hope on the death of Barney Barnato. He held the seat for 32 years. In 1897, he also became a director of De Beers Consolidated Mines, an office he held until 1931.

Personal life 
Harris married his wife, Rosa Gabriel, in 1873, in the first Jewish wedding to take place in Kimberley.

References 

 Ensiklopedie van Suidelike Afrika, Eric Rosenthal, 1967

1852 births
1942 deaths
South African businesspeople
South African Jews
British emigrants to the Colony of Natal